Andrew Timson (birth registered second  1961) is an English former professional rugby league footballer who played in the 1970s and 1980s.

Playing career

County Cup Final appearances
Andrew Timson played  in Castleford's 10-5 victory over Bradford Northern in the 1981 Yorkshire County Cup Final during the 1981–82 season at Headingley Rugby Stadium, Leeds, on Saturday 3 October 1981, and played left-, i.e. number 11, in the 2-13 defeat by Hull F.C. in the 1983 Yorkshire County Cup Final during the 1983–84 season at Elland Road, Leeds, on Saturday 15 October 1983.

References

External links

1961 births
Living people
Castleford Tigers players
Doncaster R.L.F.C. players
English rugby league players
Rugby league locks
Rugby league players from Pontefract
Rugby league second-rows